Can't Hold Back is the seventh studio album by American country rock band Pure Prairie League, released by RCA Records. It was the first album to feature future country music star Vince Gill, who had auditioned to replace one of the Goshorn brothers. Gill jammed with the band and they offered him the position of vocalist and guitar immediately. They were not unfamiliar with Gill as, according to band member Michael Reilly, “We had seen him play in 1976 when the band he was playing with opened up for us in Oklahoma City”, remarks Reilly. “We offered him the gig then, but he said, 'Oh no, I’m playing bluegrass'”. Two years later he came to Los Angeles with Byron Berline and Sundance, and after we jammed again for a few hours, we offered him the job on the spot and he accepted”.

Gill was inducted into the Country Music Hall of Fame in 2007 after decades as an award winning (21 Grammys) solo act. Gill remained with Pure Prairie League for three albums.

Track listing
"Can't Hold Back" (Vince Gill) - 2:44
"I Can't Believe" (Gill) - 4:37
"Rude Rude Awakening" (Bruce Miller) - 3:52
"White Line" (Willie P. Bennett) - 4:25
"Misery Train" (Gill) - 4:30
"Restless Woman" (Steve Patrick Bolen, Michael Reilly) - 3:48
"I'm Goin' Away" (Gill) - 3:03
"Jerene" (Gill) - 0:58
"Livin' It Alone" (Bolen) - 3:11
"Fool Fool" (Max D. Barnes, Jerry McBee, Troy Seals) - 4:00
"Goodbye So Long" (Bolen, Reilly) - 3:00

Personnel

Steve Patrick Bolen - acoustic guitar, guitar, vocals
Michael Connor - synthesizer, keyboards
Vince Gill - acoustic guitar, banjo, dobro, guitar, violin, vocals
Michael Reilly - bass, vocals
Billy Hinds - drums

Additional personnel

Jimmie Haskell - conductor
Mike Lewis - conductor
Tom Roady - percussion
David Sanborn - alto saxophone

Production
Producers: Howard Albert, Ron Albert
Engineers: Pure Prairie League, Don Gehman
Assistant engineer: Kevin Ryan
Mixing: Don Gehman
String arrangements: Jimmie Haskell, Mike Lewis
Horn arrangements: Mike Lewis
Artwork: Shusei Nagaoka
Photography: Nick Sangiamo
Art Direction & Design: Tim Bryant

Charts
Album - Billboard (United States)

References

Pure Prairie League albums
1979 albums
Albums with cover art by Shusei Nagaoka
Albums conducted by Jimmie Haskell
Albums arranged by Jimmie Haskell